Lisa Marie Forbes (born May 5, 1981) is an American television personality and beauty queen who competed in the Miss USA pageant in 2004 and Miss Earth 2007.

Biography

Pageants
Forbes was crowned Miss Kansas USA 2004 on November 30, 2003, in Wichita, Kansas.   She competed in the pageant for five consecutive years, winning the interview award three times.  She was a semi-finalist in 2003 and 2002, third runner-up in 2001 and a non-finalist in 2000. She then represented the "Sunflower State" at the Miss USA 2004 pageant in Los Angeles, California on April 12, 2004, televised live on NBC. Her successor as Miss Kansas USA was Rachel Saunders. 

On August 1, 2007 Forbes won the United States Miss Earth title and represented the United States at the Miss Earth 2007 pageant, the third consecutive former Miss USA State titleholder to do so. At Miss Earth 2007 in Philippines, she was the first former Miss USA delegate to be unplaced.

Education and employment
Forbes was born in Olathe, Kansas and moved to Overland Park at age five. After graduating from Blue Valley Northwest High School, she attended the University of Kansas where she obtained a Bachelor of Arts degree in Communication Studies.  In 2004, Forbes said she planned to pursue a career in either public relations or marketing, and claimed her dream job would be on television as a television host. 

Forbes is passionate about the American Quarter Horse, which she grew up riding, showing and training. In October 2000, she represented the Northeast Kansas Quarter Horse Association in the All American Quarter Horse Congress Queen's Contest in Columbus, Ohio.

In 2006 Forbes appeared on the Paris edition of reality television show The Bachelor, but was eliminated in the first round. She was working as an IT recruiter at the time.
 
She and Ashley Litton (Miss Missouri USA 2004) own a pageant shop in Shawnee, Kansas.

References

External links
Miss Kansas USA official website
Miss USA official website

1982 births
Living people
Miss USA 2004 delegates
Miss Earth 2007 contestants
Miss Earth United States delegates
University of Kansas alumni
People from Olathe, Kansas
People from Shawnee, Kansas